Auburn Drive High School (ADHS) is a Canadian public high school located in the Sunset Acres neighbourhood of Westphal, Nova Scotia. It serves students from grades 10 to 12. Auburn's feeder schools include Astral Drive Junior High School and Graham Creighton Junior High School. Its elementary feeder schools are Astral Drive Elementary School, Colby Village Elementary School, Caldwell Road Elementary, Joseph Giles Elementary, Humber Park Elementary and Bell Park Academic Centre. In 2011, Auburn ranked fourth with a grade of B+ on the AIMS list.

History
Auburn Drive High school was opened in 1994. The school has approximately 900 students from grades 10–12.

Courses
Auburn Drive offers a French Immersion program and AP (advanced placement courses) and the O2 program (Options and Opportunities) courses. A number of math and English courses are available as well as other courses including: biology, chemistry, physics, geology, autobody, accounting, housing and design, print, food science, Mikmaq, Canadian history, child studies, family studies, art, and applied broadcast journalism.

Arts
Auburn has courses in drama, music vocal, band, drumline, Film and Video and visual arts. Auburn has put on a number of musical theatre productions such as Grease, The Wizard of Oz, Cabaret, Les Misérables, Into the Woods and Fiddler on the Roof, as well as the theatrical production of The Love of Three Oranges. Auburn has also performed on the opening night in the main theatre of the local high school drama festival, dramafest, for many years.

The drama 12 class performs a puppet show at the local elementary schools. The drama 12 students also help teach the students with learning disabilities.

Every two years during March Break, the fine arts students travel abroad.

Sports
Varsity and junior varsity sports teams include Hockey, Basketball, Soccer, Rugby, Football, Volleyball and Table Tennis.
 
The girls hockey team has won provincial titles. In 2011 the Auburn boys basketball team won their first provincial title, and then won again 2013–2015.

Student council
Auburn's student council creates spirit days for holidays and events and hosts pep rallies for sports teams and fundraisers for various school projects. The council is composed of several sub-committees, each responsible for running different events within the school.

Covid-19 
The school was shut down on November 20, 2020, for two weeks after two COVID-19 cases were connected to the school.

Notable alumni 
Gary Beals - Second-place finisher in the first season of Canadian Idol
Matt Mays -  Canadian folk-rock singer
Alex Tanguay - NHL player for Colorado Avalanche.

References

External links

High schools in Halifax, Nova Scotia
Educational institutions established in 1993
Schools in Halifax, Nova Scotia
International Baccalaureate schools in Nova Scotia
1993 establishments in Nova Scotia